Westley Allan Dodd (July 3, 1961 – January 5, 1993) was an American convicted serial killer and sex offender. In 1989, he sexually assaulted and murdered three young boys in Vancouver, Washington. He was arrested later that year after a failed attempt to abduct a six-year-old boy at a movie theatre.

Dodd wrote detailed accounts of his murders in a diary that was found by police. After pleading guilty to the charges of murder, he received the death penalty. After refusing an automatic appeal, he was executed by hanging on January 5, 1993, the first legal hanging in the United States since 1965.

Early life 
Westley Allan Dodd was born in Toppenish, Washington, on July 3, 1961, the oldest of Jim and Carol Dodd's three children. Dodd claimed he was never abused or neglected as a child. He claimed, however, that the words "I love you" were never said to him as he grew up, nor could he ever remember saying them. His younger brother Gregory was arrested in 2016 for the attempted sexual abuse of a 13-year-old girl.

The Seattle Times reported that Dodd described in a diary written during his imprisonment that his father was emotionally and physically abusive, that he was often neglected in favor of his younger siblings, and that he witnessed violent fights between his parents. At school, Dodd was not welcomed into any social groups, leaving him with no friends. By the age of 9, Dodd had discovered that he was sexually attracted to other boys. On July 3, 1976—Dodd's 15th birthday—his father attempted suicide following an argument with his wife. He graduated from Richland High School in 1979.

Criminal history

Sex offenses
At the age of 13, Dodd began exposing himself to children in his neighborhood. His father eventually told an Oregon newspaper that he was aware of the behavior but largely ignored it, since he felt his son was otherwise a "well-behaved child who never had problems with drugs, drinking, or smoking." By the time he entered high school, Dodd had progressed to child molestation, beginning with his younger cousins, and then neighborhood children he offered to babysit, as well as the children of a woman his father was dating. At the age of 15, Dodd was arrested for indecent exposure, but police released him with a recommendation of juvenile counseling.

In August 1981, at the age of 20, Dodd tried to abduct two girls, who reported him to the police. No action was taken. The following month, he enlisted in the US Navy, and was assigned to the submarine base in Bangor, Washington, where he began abusing children who lived on the base.

Once, Dodd offered a group of boys $50 to accompany him to a motel room for a game of strip poker. This time, he was arrested. Despite confessing to police that he planned to molest the boys, he was released, with no charges filed. Shortly afterwards, he was arrested again for exposing himself to a boy and was dishonorably discharged from the Navy. Dodd spent 19 days in jail and underwent court-ordered counselling. In May 1984, he was arrested for molesting a 10-year-old boy but received only a suspended sentence.

Dodd planned his entire life around easy access to "targets", as he referred to children. He moved into an apartment block that housed families with children, and worked at fast food restaurants, as a charity truck driver, and other such jobs. He repeatedly molested the pre-school-aged children of a neighbor, but the woman declined to press charges, fearing the experience would be too traumatic for her children.

In 1987, Dodd tried to lure a young boy into a vacant building, but the boy refused to go with him and instead told the police. Prosecutors were aware of Dodd's history of sexual offenses and recommended five years in prison. However, once again, Dodd received minimal punishment because he had not actually touched the boy or exposed himself. He was placed on probation and ordered to seek psychiatric treatment. After finishing probation, he stopped going to treatment and moved to Vancouver, Washington, where he was hired as a shipping clerk.

In the early autumn of 1989, Dodd decided that David Douglas Park in Vancouver, a large, heavily wooded park with several secluded trails, would be a good place to find potential victims. He was arrested several times over the next few years for child molestation, each time serving short jail sentences and being given court-mandated therapy. All his victims (around 50 in all) were below the age of 12, some of them as young as 2, and most of them were boys.

Dodd's sexual fantasies became increasingly violent over the years; he would later say, "The more I thought about it, the more exciting the idea of murder sounded. I planned many ways to kill a boy." A psychiatrist who evaluated Dodd following one of his convictions said that he fit the legal criteria for a "sexual psychopath".

Murders
On September 4, 1989, Dodd went to Vancouver's David Douglas Park, with a fish fillet knife and shoelaces, and sought out young boys to kill. He lured two brothers, 11- and 10-year-old Cole and William Neer, to a secluded area, where he forced them to undress, tied them to a tree and performed sex acts on them both. When he was done, he stabbed them repeatedly with a knife and fled the scene. The boys were soon discovered in the park. Cole was dead at the scene, while William died en route to a nearby hospital.

After the murders of the two brothers, Dodd started a scrapbook with newspaper clippings and other facts about the murders. On October 29, Dodd drove to Portland, Oregon, where he encountered four-year-old Lee Iseli and his nine-year-old brother Justin at a local park. The younger boy was playing alone on a slide, and Dodd succeeded in convincing the boy to come with him. Justin had gone home, so Dodd told Lee that he would drive him back to his house. He managed to take Lee to his apartment in Vancouver apparently unnoticed, and he ordered the boy to undress. Dodd then tied Lee to his bed and molested him, taking photographs of the abuse. Dodd kept Lee overnight while he continued to sexually abuse him, all the while jotting down every detail in his diary. The next morning, he strangled Lee to death with a rope and hung his body in the closet, photographing it as a macabre "trophy".

He would later confess to police that he had originally planned not to kill the boy, but eventually decided that it was necessary to keep him from telling anyone. Dodd stuffed Lee's nude body in trash bags and threw it in some bushes near Vancouver Lake. He burned Lee's clothing in a trash barrel except for the boy's underwear, which he kept as a souvenir of the crime. One day later, Lee's body was discovered, which sparked a manhunt for the killer. Dodd kept a low profile and mostly stayed in his apartment, writing down future plans for child abduction and also constructing a homemade torture rack for the next victim.

Arrest
On November 13, 1989, Dodd drove to Camas, Washington, around 12 miles east of Vancouver, where he attempted to abduct 6-year-old James Kirk II from the restroom of the New Liberty Theatre.  The child began fighting and crying as Dodd was leaving the theatre through the lobby, carrying the boy in his arms. Despite Dodd's attempts to calm the boy, theatre employees became suspicious and followed Dodd out to the street. Due to their pursuit, Dodd released his victim, got into his car, and drove away.

The boyfriend of the boy's mother, William "Ray" Graves, came to the theatre lobby and was told that the boy had nearly been abducted. Graves went outside the theatre in the direction where Dodd was last seen. Dodd's car had broken down a short distance away from the theatre and he was attempting to start the motor. In order not to raise Dodd's suspicion and to stall for time, Graves pretended to be a passerby and offered to help him. He then put Dodd into a headlock and returned him to the theatre, where employees called the police.

The local police contacted the Portland Police task force investigating the kidnapping and murder of Lee Iseli. Dodd was taken to the Camas Police station, where Portland task force lead detectives C.W. Jensen and Dave Trimble interviewed him. He was then taken to the Clark County jail in Vancouver, where Jensen and Trimble continued their interrogation over the course of three days. Eventually, Dodd confessed to all three murders. Jensen and Trimble then served a search warrant at Dodd's home in Vancouver.

During the search of Dodd's home, police discovered a homemade torture rack, along with newspaper clippings about his crimes, a briefcase containing Lee Iseli's underwear, a photo album containing pictures of Lee Iseli, and assorted photographs of children in newspaper and store catalogue underwear advertisements. They also discovered Dodd's diary, in which he wrote in detail about the murders.

Dodd was charged with aggravated first-degree murder in the deaths of the Neer brothers and Lee Iseli, plus attempted kidnapping of another child. He initially pleaded not guilty to all charges, but later changed his plea to guilty.

Trial
During his trial in Clark County Superior Court, the prosecution read aloud excerpts of Dodd's diary and displayed photographs of Lee Iseli. The defense did not call any witnesses or present any evidence, suggesting only that Dodd must be legally insane. The jury found Dodd guilty; prosecutors requested the death penalty and the jury agreed. Dodd would claim that speaking in his own defense was pointless, and ultimately, "the system had failed repeatedly". Washington State law gave Dodd the choice of execution by lethal injection or by hanging; Dodd stated that he wished to die by hanging because that was how he had killed Lee Iseli, his last victim.

In 1990, Dodd was sentenced to death for the murder of the Neer brothers, as well as for the separate rape and murder of Lee Iseli.

Execution
Less than four years elapsed between the murders and Dodd's execution. He refused to appeal his case or the capital sentence. He insisted that he could not control his urges and would kill again, stating in one court brief: "I must be executed before I have an opportunity to escape or kill someone else. If I do escape, I promise you I will kill and rape again, and I will enjoy every minute of it." He also said in some interviews that death would give him relief from guilt over the murders. During his trial, he wrote a pamphlet on how parents could protect children from child molesters such as himself.

Dodd's execution by hanging was the first in the United States since George York and James Latham were hanged by Kansas in 1965. The execution was witnessed by 12 members of local and regional media, prison officials, and family members of the three victims. Dodd ordered broiled salmon and fried potatoes for his last meal. His last words, spoken from the second floor of the indoor gallows, were recorded by the media witnesses as:

Dodd was executed at 12:05 a.m. on January 5, 1993, at Washington State Penitentiary in Walla Walla. He was pronounced dead by the prison doctor and his body was transported to Seattle for autopsy. King County Medical Examiner Donald Reay found that Dodd had died quickly, within two to three minutes, though not from a broken neck, which is the usual cause of death from hanging. Reay stated that Dodd's death had likely not been very painful. Dodd was cremated following the autopsy, and his ashes turned over to his family.

Execution controversy 
Dodd's execution came with some controversy over his choice of execution by hanging. The American Civil Liberties Union filed a lawsuit saying that this method of execution was a violation of the 8th Amendment of the United States Constitution. The lawsuit made it all the way to the Washington Supreme Court, but was unsuccessful in blocking Dodd's execution, largely because Dodd himself chose hanging.

On the day of the execution, many people gathered outside the prison, either supporting or protesting the execution. There was much media attention; some TV news reports featured stories on the history of hanging, showing such things as the loud sound that the trap door can make, along with the silence that follows it, and the type of rope that was going to be used, and how to properly prepare it for optimum effect.

In popular culture
Dodd's profile was featured along with another convicted sexual predator imprisoned in Washington in the 1992 Frontline episode "Monsters Among Us".

Dodd's crimes are included in the Investigation Discovery series Real Detective. In the episode titled "Malice", detective C. W. Jensen describes his involvement in bringing Dodd to justice and the effect it had on him personally.

In 2006 Discovery Channel television show Most Evil analyzed his life and crimes. He was ranked at level 22, the highest point of the scale.

Dodd was the basis for an unseen character, a child killer named "Wayne Dobbs", in the 2002 film Insomnia, starring Al Pacino. He was fictionalized as a man who murdered a young boy in a way similar to Dodd's murder of Lee Iseli.

Several books have been written about the case, including: When the Monster Comes Out of the Closet by Lori Steinhorst, who communicated with Dodd in writing and by phone almost daily for 18 months prior to his execution; Driven to Kill by true crime author Gary C. King; and Dr. Ron Turco's book about his experience during the initial investigation to assist in developing a profile of the killer.

See also
Sergey Golovkin

General:
 List of people executed in Washington
 List of serial killers in the United States

References

Further reading

1961 births
1989 murders in the United States
1993 deaths
20th-century American criminals
20th-century executions by Washington (state)
20th-century executions of American people
American male criminals
American murderers of children
American people convicted of child sexual abuse
American people convicted of rape
Crime in Washington (state)
Criminals from Washington (state)
Child abuse incidents and cases
Child sexual abuse in the United States
Executed American serial killers
Executed people from Washington (state)
Incidents of violence against boys
Male serial killers
People convicted of murder by Washington (state)
People executed by Washington (state) by hanging
People from Richland, Washington
People from Toppenish, Washington
People from Vancouver, Washington
People with antisocial personality disorder
Torture in the United States
United States Navy sailors
Violence against men in North America